Serpent Kingdoms is a supplement to the 3.5 edition of the Dungeons & Dragons role-playing game.

Contents
Serpent Kingdoms details the creatures collectively known as the Scaled Ones in the Forgotten Realms setting: the lizardfolk, nagas, yuan-ti, and the creator race the sarrukh.

Publication history
Serpent Kingdoms was written by Eric L. Boyd, Darrin Drader, and Ed Greenwood, and published in July 2004. Cover art was by Michael Sutfin, with interior art by Kalman Andrasofszky, Thomas Baxa, Dennis Crabapple, Wayne England, Carl Frank, Ralph Horsley, Jim Pavelec, Richard Sardinha, and Joel Thomas.

Reception

References

Forgotten Realms sourcebooks
Role-playing game supplements introduced in 2004